Ropeley is a rural locality in the Lockyer Valley Region, Queensland, Australia. In the  Ropeley had a population of 194 people.

Geography
Ropeley East is a neighbourhood in the east of the locality.

History

The Deep Gully Provisional School opened in 1890 and in 1892 was renamed Ropeley Provisional School. On 2 Sep 1901 it became Ropeley State School. The school celebrated its centenary in 1990.

Ropeley East State School opened on 4 May 1915. It  closed in 1955.

This Lutheran congregation at Ropeley formed in 1886. The Ropeley Immanuel Lutheran Church was officially opened on Sunday 4 February 1923 with a crowd of approximately 1,200 people. The opening of the church brought together two previously separate Lutheran congregations in the district.

On Sunday 21 June 1914 the Ropeley Apostolic Church was officially opened and dedicated by Reverend Heinrich Frederick Nieumeyer. The land was donated by August Schneider. The church was built by Mr L. Roberts for £140 with volunteers assisting with the carting. The altar was built from cedar by Mr Laffey of Left-Hand Branch, Mount Sylvia, to a design by Mr Roth of Laidley.

In the  Ropeley had a population of 194 people.

Education

Ropeley State School is a government primary (Prep-6) school for boys and girls at 4 Hoger Road. In 2013, the school had 11 enrolled students with two teaching staff (one equivalent full-time). In 2015, only one child was enrolled. In 2018, the school had an enrolment of 5 students with 2 teachers (1 full-time equivalent) and 4 non-teaching staff (1 full-time equivalent).

There is no secondary school in Ropeley. The nearest government secondary school is Lockyer District State High School in Gatton to the north.

Amenities

Ropeley Immanuel Lutheran Church is at 400 Ropeley Rockside Road. It holds weekly Sunday services.

Ropely Apostolic Church is at 86 Steinmullers Road.

Ropeley has two cemeteries:
 Ropeley Immanuel Lutheran cemetery, adjacent to the church
 Ropeley Scandinavian Lutheran cemetery, associated with the former Scandinavian Lutheran congregation

References

Further reading
 
 

Lockyer Valley Region
Localities in Queensland